Dagmar Kriste is a former East German slalom canoeist who competed in the 1970s. She won a gold medal in the K-1 team event at the 1971 ICF Canoe Slalom World Championships in Meran.

References

East German female canoeists
Possibly living people
Year of birth missing (living people)
Medalists at the ICF Canoe Slalom World Championships